Silcock is a surname. Variations include Silcocks and Silcox. Notable people with the surname include:

Burton W. Silcock (1922–2008), American 7th Director of the Bureau of Land Management
Dick Silcock, English rugby league footballer
Frank Silcock (1838-1897), English cricketer and founding member of Essex County Cricket Club
 Helen Silcock (1865-1951), English trade unionist and suffragette
Jack Silcock (1898–1966), English Association footballer
 Marc Silcock (born 1988), British actor
Mark Silcox, Indian-born British comedian 
Matthew Silcocks (born 1993), Australian Paralympian
 Nat Silcock Jr. (1927–1992), English rugby league footballer who played in the 1940s, 1950s and 1960s, and coached in the 1960s 
 Nat Silcock Sr., English rugby league footballer who played in the 1920s and 1930s
Nicholas Silcox (born 1989), Australian lightweight rower
Thomas Ball Silcock (1854 –1924), British Liberal Party politician
William Silcock (1868–1933), English cricketer

See also 
 Sillcock (also "Silcock"), a form of valve
 Silcock Family, a family from Huntington Beach, California, USA
 BOCM Silcock, a former British company